Pristimantis ramagii is a species of frog in the family Strabomantidae. It is endemic to northeastern Brazil and occurs between Paraíba and northern Bahia. Common name Paraiba robber frog has been coined for it. Its natural habitats are primary and secondary forests as well as forest edges and rocky areas. It is usually found in leaf litter or in low vegetation. It is an extremely abundant species that could face threats from habitat loss caused by agriculture, livestock grazing, logging, and human settlement. It occurs in a number of protected areas.

References

ramagii
Endemic fauna of Brazil
Amphibians of Brazil
Taxa named by George Albert Boulenger
Amphibians described in 1888
Taxonomy articles created by Polbot